Osbert Potter (born May 8, 1956 in Tortola, British Virgin Islands) is a British Virgin Islander-American Virgin Islander politician who served as the 11th Lieutenant Governor of the United States Virgin Islands from 2015 to 2019.

Biography
Osbert Potter was the third of eight children born to Margaret and Cecil Potter on the island of Tortola, British Virgin Islands. At the age of 10, he moved to the island of Saint Thomas, U.S. Virgin Islands. He would later attend the Charlotte Amalie High School, graduating in 1974. He would continue his education at the University of the Virgin Islands, graduating cum laude in 1978 with a Bachelor of Arts in Business Administration, concentrating in Finance.

He was a part-time instructor at the University of the Virgin Islands from 1978–1992. He later successfully campaigned for a seat in the Legislature of the Virgin Islands, being elected to the 20th and 21st Legislature in 1992 and 1994 respectively. During his tenure, he served as Chairman of the Committee of Economic Development, Agriculture and Consumer Protection. Potter joined the Virgin Islands National Guard in 1985 and served for 23 years.  In 2004, he was hired to head WTJX-TV, the only PBS affiliate in the territory.

References

1956 births
21st-century American politicians
British Virgin Islands emigrants to the United States Virgin Islands
Lieutenant Governors of the United States Virgin Islands
Living people
People from Saint Thomas, U.S. Virgin Islands
Senators of the Legislature of the United States Virgin Islands
University of the Virgin Islands alumni